"Rip it Up" is the third single from Australian rock musician James Reyne’s debut self titled solo studio album in (1987).

Background and promotion
Reyne was the lead singer of Australian rock band Australian Crawl who played their final show is at the Perth Entertainment Centre on 1 February 1986. Following this, Reyne began work on his solo career. Reyne's 1987/88 tour was called the "Rip it Up Tour" after this track.

Track listings
 CD Single/ 7”
 "Rip it Up" - 3:34
 "Love Will Find a Way" -

 Vinyl / 12" 
 A1	"Rip It Up" (Cuttin' The Rug Version) - 6:37
 A2	"Rip It Up" (Bonus Beats) - 1:57
 B1	"Rip It Up" (Dub Mix) - 5:21
 B2	"Rip It Up" (Alternate Dub Mix) - 5:24

Chart positions

External links

References

1987 songs
1987 singles
Capitol Records singles
James Reyne songs
Songs written by James Reyne